The 2021 Inter Miami CF season was the second season of existence for Inter Miami CF. They participated in Major League Soccer, the top tier of soccer in the United States. Outside of MLS, the club was originally to participate in the U.S. Open Cup, before the competition's cancelation.

Background 

Inter Miami is coming off their inaugural campaign, which marked the first time since 2001, with the Miami Fusion, that a soccer club in Greater Miami played in the first tier of American soccer. Ahead of and during the season, Miami signed several high-profile players including Argentine international, Gonzalo Higuaín, from Juventus; Mexican international, Rodolfo Pizarro, from Monterrey; and French international, Blaise Matuidi, from Juventus. The club also signed several notable young players including Matías Pellegrini, Lewis Morgan, and David Norman. Additionally, in the 2020 MLS SuperDraft, Miami drafted Clemson standout, Robbie Robinson with the first overall pick.

The club's first season was significantly altered due to the COVID-19 pandemic, which saw the season suspended on March 12 and not resume until July 8 with the MLS is Back Tournament. Miami lost their first two league matches before the season was suspended and subsequently lost their three group stage matches (which counted towards the regular season standings) at the MLS is Back Tournament. On August 22 against Floridian rivals, Orlando City SC, Miami won their first league match. Inter had better form following the MLS is Back Tournament, ultimately going 7–8–3, and finished the 2020 regular season with a 7–13–3 record, after 23 league matches, a reduction of the original 34 due to the COVID-19 pandemic.

Due to the pandemic, the size of the 2020 MLS Cup Playoffs was increased from eight teams in the Eastern Conference qualifying to 10 teams qualifying. Miami earned the 10th and final seed in the playoffs, where they played at fellow expansion side, Nashville SC in the Play-In Round on November 20. Miami lost the match 0–3, with several of their starters missing the match due to an outbreak of coronavirus on the team.

At the conclusion of the 2020 season, the club declined options on eight players. Notable players who did not have their contract renewed for the 2021 season included starting goalkeeper, Luis Robles, as well as Juan Agudelo, and Andres Reyes.

Review

Offseason 
On January 7, 2021, Inter Miami and first year head coach, Diego Alonso mutually agreed to part ways. Several names were rumored as Alonso's successor including Phil Neville. On January 18, 2021, Neville was confirmed as head coach.

Management

|-
!colspan="2" style="background:#F7B5CD; color:#000000; text-align:left" |Ownership
|-

|-
!colspan="2" style="background:#F7B5CD; color:#000000; text-align:left" |Front Office
|-

|-
!colspan="2" style="background:#F7B5CD; color:#000000; text-align:left" |Coaching Staff
|-

Roster

Transfers

Transfers in

Transfers out

MLS SuperDraft

Non-competitive

Preseason

Competitive

Major League Soccer

Standings

Eastern Conference

Overall table

Results summary

Results by round

Match results

U.S. Open Cup 

On July 20, US Soccer finally announced that the tournament would be cancelled for 2021 and would resume in 2022.

Statistics

Overall 
{|class="wikitable"
|-
|Games played ||34
|-
|Games won ||12
|-
|Games drawn ||5  
 |-
|Games lost ||17 
|-
|Goals scored ||36 
|-
|Goals conceded ||53 
|-
|Goal difference ||-17 
|-
|Clean sheets ||7
|-
|Yellow cards ||55 
|-
|Red cards ||3 
|-
|Worst discipline ||
|-
|Best result(s) ||5-1(FC Cincinnati)
|-
|Worst result(s) ||0-5(New England Revolution)
|-
|Most appearances || 26 games (Lewis Morgan)
|-
|Top scorer ||12 goals(Gonzalo Higuaín)  
|-
|Points || Overall:41
|-

Appearances and goals 
Numbers after plus–sign (+) denote appearances as a substitute.

Top scorers 

As of 8 November 2021.

Top assists

Disciplinary record

Awards and honors 
To be announced during the 2021 season.

References 

2021
2021 Major League Soccer season
American soccer clubs 2020 season
2021 in sports in Florida